Meitei literature, also known as Manipuri literature, is literature written in the Meitei language of Manipur. An ancient institution of learning, the Luwang Nonghumsang, later known as the Pandit Loishang, collected sources of indigenous Meitei knowledge and philosophy until the 18th century. Writing by Meiteis is assumed to go back to the Kingdom of Kangleipak in the early 12th century. The Meitei script is a Brahmic abugida. It is known only from the Puya manuscripts discovered in the first half of the 20th century. Manuscripts of the 18th and 19th centuries were written using the Bengali alphabet. The existence of the Meitei script in the 15th-century hinges on the authenticity of an inscription dated to the reign of Senbi Kiyamba. The first printed Manipuri book, Manipurer Itihas, appeared in 1890 from the Baptist Mission Press, Calcutta. Though the kings of Manipur had established contact with the British from the middle of the eighteenth century onward the real impact of the contact came much later. Johnstone Middle English School, based on the western system of education, was started in 1885 at Imphal, and in 1891 Manipur lost its independence to the British. British domination facilitated the introduction of new systems in the civil, political and educational spheres, which hastened the process of modernization in Manipur, exposed as it was to new ideas and influences.

Ancient Meitei literature

Chada Laihui 
The Chada Laihui is a historical document (puya), about the genealogy of the Meitei kings from their mothers' sides. It traces the genealogical account of the kings' mothers' lineage. It is a supplementary document to the Cheitharol Kumbaba, the foremost royal chronicle of  Manipur.

Moirang Ningthourol Lambuba 
"Moirang Ningthourol Lambuba" is a historical document (puya), which served as the court chronicle of the rulers of the kingdom in Ancient Moirang. It records the genealogy of the kings of the Moirang dynasty.

The chronicle also slightly mentioned about the history of the Zeliangrong people.

Medieval Meitei literature

Modern Meitei literature

Puyas 
Meitei Puya manuscripts have been discovered by scholars, beginning in the 1930s. These are chronicles, and evidence that Hindus arrived from the Indian subcontinent with royal marriages at least by the 14th century, and in centuries thereafter, from what is now modern Assam, Bengal, Uttar Pradesh, Dravidian kingdoms, and other regions. Another manuscript suggests that Muslims arrived in Manipur in the 17th century, from what is now Bangladesh, during the reign of Meidingu Khagemba. Meitei literature documents the persistent and devastating Manipur–Burma wars.

Suppression of Meitei Literature 
After the adoption of Hinduism as state religion under Gharib Nawaz (1717), it appears that the Puyas were "burnt completely" at Kangla Uttra under royal orders, in either 1729 or in 1732.

The Puya manuscripts discovered in the 20th century at best have a tenuous connection with the texts burned under Gharib Nawaz. Like the Hindu and Jain Puranas, the extant Puyas contain cosmology, genealogies of gods and goddesses, and royal chronicles.

Epics 

 
The Numit Kappa ("Shooting the Sun") is a mythological text in narrative verse. It was published in English translation by T.C. Hodson (1908). A translation into modern Meitei was published in 1908.

Ougri (also known as Leiroi Ngongloi Eshei) is a poem written in archaic Meitei.

The sagas of the seven epic cycles of incarnations of the two divine lovers were originated from Moirang kingdom near the shores of the Loktak lake in Ancient Kangleipak (early Manipur). Among them, Khamba Thoibi is regarded as the last and the greatest epic.

Chronicles 
The Ningthourol Shingkak is a work written under Gharib Nawaz, written in the mode of "predictions" made during the rule of Khagemba (r. 1597–1652) and thus foretelling the birth and reign of Gharib Nawaz and his religious reforms. The Cheitharol Kumbaba or "Royal Chronicle" is a text written down in the early 19th century, under Jai Singh, the puppet king installed after the Burmese invasion, purportedly based on an older copy which was no longer available. It contains day-to-day transactions and occurrences the state.

Scriptures

 The Meitei scriptures are a number of books and other texts which tell about Meitei religion (Sanamahism) as well as Meitei mythology. They are the sacred literature for the Meitei pagans. Notably, one should not confused all the Puya (Meitei texts) to be Meitei scriptures, because many puyas were written based on the topics irrelevant to religion.

Pages with unreviewed translations
Sanamahism
Puyas

Literary awards

Sahitya Akademi awards 
 Sahitya Akademi Award for Meitei
 Sahitya Akademi Translation Prize for Meitei
 Yuva Puraskar for Meitei

Patriotic Writers' Forum awards 
 Pacha Meetei Literary Award 
 R Kathing Tangkhul Literary Award 
 Dr Saroj Nalini Parratt Literary Award

See also 
Aribam Syam Sharma
Heisnam Kanhailal
History of Manipur
Meitei mythology
Khwairakpam Chaoba
M. K. Binodini Devi
Meitei inscriptions
Rajkumar Singhajit Singh
Ratan Thiyam
List of Sahitya Akademi Award winners for Meitei

Notes

References

External links 

Sahitya Akadmi Award 
Manipuri Literature
Books Reviews

Meitei literature
Ancient Indian literature
Ancient literature
Asian literature
Bangladeshi literature
Classical literature
Culture of Manipur
History of literature
History of Manipur
Indian literature
Indian literature by language
Literature about race and ethnicity
Literature by ethnicity
Literature of Indian independence movement
Meitei culture
Meitei language
Religious literature
South Asian literature
Southeast Asian literature